Syndermata is a clade of animals that, in some systems, is considered synonymous with Rotifera. Older systems separate Rotifera and Acanthocephala as different phyla, and group them both under Syndermata.

References 

Platyzoa